Martina Conroy is a camogie player, a member of the Galway team that contested the All Ireland finals of 2010 and 2011,

Other awards
All Ireland Club Championship 2011, All Ireland Intermediate 2009, Junior Gael Linn Cup 2007, All Ireland Minor 2004.

References

External links
 Camogie.ie Official Camogie Association Website

Living people
Galway camogie players
Year of birth missing (living people)